Commit Yourself Completely is the second live album by American indie rock band Car Seat Headrest, released digitally on June 17, 2019 by Matador Records. It compiles songs performed by the band on tour in 2018 across the United States, United Kingdom and France, with the members of the Naked Giants playing with the group in a seven-person lineup. The indie rock album includes live renditions of songs from Teens of Denial (2016) and Twin Fantasy (2011, 2018), as well as a cover of Frank Ocean's "Ivy". It was promoted by a video of the band's performance of "Fill in the Blank" at Newport Music Hall.

Track listing

Personnel
Credits adapted from Bandcamp.

Performance
 Will Toledo – vocals, guitar on "Ivy"
 Seth Dalby – bass guitar
 Ethan Ives – guitar, vocals
 Andrew Katz – drums, vocals
 Grant Mullen – guitar, vocals
 Gianni Aiello – guitar, keyboards, vocals
 Henry LaVallee – additional percussion

Production
 Will Toledo – production, mixing
 Andrew Katz – mixing, mastering
 John McRae – engineering
 Veronica Anderson – sleeve photo

References

2019 live albums
Car Seat Headrest albums
Matador Records live albums